Joseph Charles Borelli (born July 27, 1982) is an American politician and the New York City Council member for the 51st district and Minority Leader of the New York City Council. He is a Republican. The district encompasses much of Staten Island's South Shore.

Early life, education, and career 

Joseph was born on Staten Island and adopted at birth by the Borelli family. He attended Public School 4, Our Lady Star of the Sea Grammar School, and St. Joseph by-the-Sea High School, from which he graduated in 2000. While there he was a founder and President of the Holy Name Society, and a star on the football team.

After graduating from Marist College, he worked on the campaign of first-time candidate Vincent Ignizio, who was elected to the New York State Assembly from the South Shore-based 62nd District. He became Chief-of-Staff to the then-Assemblyman, and continued in that role when Ignizio was elected to the New York City Council in February 2007.  He is a former adjunct lecturer in political science at the College of Staten Island, City University of New York, where he received a Master's degree.

Political career
Borelli was elected on November 6, 2012, to the State Assembly to succeed the retiring Louis Tobacco. He was one of only two Republicans in New York City's State Assembly delegation.  In 2013, he earned the highest rating from the Conservative party for being the most conservative member of the legislature from New York City.  He was also the only member of the legislature from the city to vote against the NY SAFE Act..  He served as the ranking member of the committee on Cities for three years.

On November 3, 2015, Borelli won election to replace fellow Republican Vincent Ignizio on the City Council. Ignizio left in July to work for a nonprofit. He was sworn into office on November 30, 2015, and was chosen to be the Council's Minority Whip. Borelli serves as the chair of the Council's Committee on Fire and Emergency Management.

In 2016, Borelli frequently appeared on national cable TV news shows where he supported Donald Trump as the Republican presidential nominee.  Borelli also co-chaired Trump’s campaign during the 2016 New York Republican primary. Borelli was re-elected in the New York City Council elections, 2017, winning 80% of the vote. While retaining his Council seat, he lost a 2019 election for New York City Public Advocate, earning 20% of the citywide vote.

In 2019, New York State Republican Chairman Nick Langworthy named Borelli as a spokesman to help spread the New York GOP's message during the 2020 election cycle.

In 2019, Borelli was the Republican and Conservative Party nominee for NYC Public Advocate running against Democratic incumbent Jumaane Williams. Williams won the race garnering 77.9 percent of the vote. 

On November 17, 2021, Borelli was elected as Minority Leader of the City Council's Republican delegation, replacing outgoing Council Member Steven Matteo.

References

1982 births
Living people
American adoptees
Republican Party members of the New York State Assembly
Marist College alumni
21st-century American politicians
New York City Council members
Politicians from Staten Island